Lokendra Bahadur Chand ( born 15 February 1940) was the 27th prime minister of Nepal four times: from 1983 to 1986, briefly during April 1990, briefly during 1997 and from October 2002 until June 2003. He is also involved in literature and have won a Madan Puraskar for his book Bisarjan in 2054 B.S.

Chand was born in Kurkutiya Village, Baitadi District, Nepal in 1940. He is a major supporter of the Nepalese monarchy. He served as the speaker of Rastriya Panchayat. During his first two terms as Prime Minister, he did not belong to any political party, but by 1997 he was a member of his current political party, the conservative Rashtriya Prajatantra Party (RPP). He became Prime Minister on October 11, 2002, a week after the king launched a coup against the Nepali Congress government of Sher Bahadur Deuba. Chand was the head of the 2002 cabinet. Chand was forced to resign in 2003 after massive protests and an intensification of the civil war with Maoist rebels.

Ahead of the 2008 Constituent Assembly election, Chand is the top candidate of RPP for the closed proportional representation list.

He has four sons and three daughter. Sons arw Jayant Chand, Arun Chand, Binod Chand and Bhupenn Chand. Jayant Chand is in politics and became Minister twice and is active in his father's party. Arun Chand is a businessman. Binod Chand is a computer engineer. And the youngest son Bhupenn Chand is an actor and philanthropist who now lives in the USA.

References

1940 births
Living people
People from Baitadi District
Prime ministers of Nepal
Rastriya Prajatantra Party politicians
Thakuri
Members of the Rastriya Panchayat
Nepal MPs 1994–1999
People of the Nepalese Civil War
20th-century prime ministers of Nepal
21st-century prime ministers of Nepal

Nepalese Hindus
Khas people
Members of the 1st Nepalese Constituent Assembly